Carnauba, also called Brazil wax and palm wax, is a wax of the leaves of the carnauba palm Copernicia prunifera (synonym: Copernicia cerifera), a plant native to and grown only in the northeastern Brazilian states of Ceará, Piauí, Pernambuco,  Rio Grande do Norte, Maranhão and Bahia. It is known as the "Queen of Waxes". In its pure state, it is usually available in the form of hard yellow-brown flakes. It is obtained by collecting and drying the leaves, beating them to loosen the wax, then refining and bleaching it.
As a food additive, its E number is E903.

Composition

Carnauba consists mostly of aliphatic esters (40 wt%), diesters of 4-hydroxycinnamic acid (21.0 wt%), ω-hydroxycarboxylic acids (13.0 wt%), and fatty alcohols (12 wt%). The compounds are predominantly derived from acids and alcohols in the C26-C30 range. It is distinctive for its high content of diesters and its methoxycinnamic acid.

It is sold in grades of T1, T3 and T4 according to its purity level, which is accomplished by filtration, centrifugation and bleaching.

Properties
Because it creates a glossy finish, carnauba wax is used in automobile waxes, shoe polishes, dental floss, food products (such as sweets), polishes for musical instruments, and floor and furniture waxes and polishes, especially when mixed with beeswax and turpentine. It is commonly used for paper coatings in the United States. In its purest form, it was often used on speedboat hulls in the early 1960s to enhance speed and handling in saltwater. It is also the main ingredient in surfboard wax, combined with coconut oil.

Because of its hypoallergenic and emollient properties as well as its gloss, carnauba wax is used as a thickener in cosmetics such as lipstick, eyeliner, mascara, eye shadow, foundation, deodorant, and skincare and sun care preparations. It is also used to make cutler's resin.

It is the finish of choice for most briar tobacco and smoking pipes, as it produces a high gloss when buffed that dulls with time, rather than flaking off like most other finishes.

Because it is too brittle to be used alone, carnauba wax is often combined with other waxes (principally beeswax) to treat and waterproof leather products, where it provides a high-gloss finish and increases leather's hardness and durability.

It is also used in the pharmaceutical industry as a coating to make tablets easier to swallow. A very small amount (less than 1/100 of 1% by weight, e.g. 30 grams per 300 kg) is sprinkled onto a batch of tablets after they have been sprayed and dried; they are then tumbled for a few minutes to coat them. 

In 1890, Charles Tainter patented the use of carnauba wax on phonograph cylinders as a replacement for the usual paraffin/beeswax mixture.

Carnauba wax may be used as a mold release agent for manufacturing fibre-reinforced plastics. An aerosol mold release agent is formed by dissolving it in a solvent. Unlike silicone or PTFE, carnauba is suitable for use with liquid epoxy, epoxy molding compounds (EMC), and some other plastic types, generally enhancing their properties . It is not very soluble in chlorinated or aromatic hydrocarbons.
It is used in melt/castable explosives to produce an insensitive explosive formula such as Composition B, which is a blend of RDX and TNT.

Production and export
In 2006, Brazil produced 22,409 tons of carnauba wax, of which 14% was solid and 86% was in powder form.
There are 20 to 25 exporters of carnauba wax in Brazil who, after buying it from middlemen or directly from farmers, refine the wax before shipping it to the rest of the world. 
The four largest exporters are Pontes, Brasil Ceras, Foncepi, and Carnauba do Brasil, who together account for around €25 million of the export market. According to the German television program Markencheck, conditions for many carnauba production workers are quite poor; one Brazilian Labor Ministry official found conditions "that could be described as slavery."

According to the Brazilian Ministry of Development, Industry and Foreign Trade, the major destinations for exported carnauba wax are:
 United States (25%)
 Japan (15–25%)
 Germany (10–15%)
 Netherlands (5%)
 Italy (5%)
 Other countries (18%)
The Initiative for Responsible Carnauba (IRC) was founded in 2018 as part of the Private Business Action for Biodiversity project, in association with the Union for Ethical BioTrade (UEBT). Its aim is to foster responsible production that respects workers’ rights and preserves biodiversity. In an established working group with 20 local manufacturers and international distributors and brands, the IRC has set social, traceability and biodiversity standards and helped local producers implement them, with the UEBT's support. In collaboration with the local NGO Associação Caatinga, the Initiative has created a manual of good practices for the sector and 12 short learning videos, available on YouTube and sharable via WhatsApp, to inform field workers of their rights and about good biodiversity practices.

Technical characteristics
INCI name: Copernicia cerifera (carnauba) wax
Melting point:  (among the highest of natural waxes; higher than beeswax)
Relative density: ~0.97
Among the hardest of natural waxes
Practically insoluble in water or ethyl alcohol
Soluble by heating in ethyl acetate or xylene

References

External links
Botanical description - from the Mildred E. Mathias Botanical Garden
Carnauba wax data sheet - from the UN Food and Agriculture Organization
Carnauba Wax Background Paper - published report from field work
Associacao Caatinga
Good Practices Manual for the Carnauba supply chain  - Associacao Caatinga/BMU-IKI/GIZ (2019)
Initiative for Responsible Carnauba - IRC
Private Business Action for Biodiversity - BMU-IKI/GIZ
Union for Ethical BioTrade - UEBT

Waxes
Food additives
Cosmetics chemicals
Non-timber forest products
E-number additives